Xicun Station is a station on Line 5 and Line 8 of the Guangzhou Metro. It is located under the junction of Huanshi Road West and Xizeng Road in the Liwan District. Huanshi Road West is one of the main shopping areas for shoes in Guangzhou. The station opened on 28 December 2009.

Station layout

References

Railway stations in China opened in 2009
Guangzhou Metro stations in Liwan District